Manastir is a village located in Laki Municipality, in Plovdiv Province, central southern Bulgaria.

Geography
Manastiris located in the Prespa section of the Rhodope Mountains, on the northern slopes of Mount Prespa. It is one of the highest inhabited villages in Bulgaria.

References

Villages in Plovdiv Province